Dalatomon is a genus of freshwater crabs, named after the Dalat area, where it is found in Vietnam.  Data are deficient concerning their IUCN Red List of Threatened Species status.

Species
 Dalatomon laevior (Kemp, 1923)
 Dalatomon loxophrys (Kemp, 1923)

References

External links

Potamoidea
Freshwater crustaceans of Asia